Aleksandr Chernikov may refer to:

 Aleksandr Chernikov (footballer, born 1970), Russian football player
 Aleksandr Chernikov (footballer, born 2000), Russian football player